Nikolay Dimitrov (born 18 August 1963) is a Bulgarian bobsledder. He competed in the two man event at the 1992 Winter Olympics.

References

1963 births
Living people
Bulgarian male bobsledders
Olympic bobsledders of Bulgaria
Bobsledders at the 1992 Winter Olympics
Sportspeople from Pleven